Atropos Key is an outdoor 1972 bronze sculpture by Hannah Stewart, installed at Houston's Miller Outdoor Theatre, in the U.S. state of Texas.

See also

 1972 in art
 List of public art in Houston

References

1972 establishments in Texas
1972 sculptures
Bronze sculptures in Texas
Hermann Park
Outdoor sculptures in Houston